Saint Peter's is a school located in Kadayiruppu, Kolenchery in Kerala State, South India. It caters a co-educational programme from Junior Kindergarten to Grade 12. The school is owned and managed by the Saint Peter's Education Trust, Kadayiruppu, a society within the meaning of the Travancore–Cochin Literary Scientific and Charitable Societies Registration Act 1952.

History
In 1986, the school's first batch of SSLC students secured100 % first class results, the first of its kind for a private school.

Affiliations
School is affiliated to CBSE (Central Board of Secondary Education, New Delhi, India) and follows its curriculum. Earlier it was affiliated to Kerala State curriculum.

Academic and programs
The Lower Primary classes, that is Classes I to V, study English, Environmental Studies, a second language Hindi or Malayalam and a third language Hindi or Malayalam.

The Upper Primary Classes, that is  Classes VI to VIII, will study all the subject that they have studied in their Lower Primary classes, except Environmental Studies would be replace with two new subjects that is Science and Social Studies.

Classes IX and X will have all the subject they have studied in their lower classes but would have to drop their third language.

Classes XI and XII will have to choose their stream of study. Science and Commerce is offered.

Science stream combination 1 
 English, Physics, Chemistry, Biology and Mathematics. 
 Science Stream combination 2 
 English, Physics, Chemistry, Biology and Informatics. 
 Science stream combination 3 
 English, Physics, Chemistry, Mathematics and Informatics. 
 Commerce stream combination 1 
 English, Accountancy, Business Studies, Economics and Mathematics. 
 Commerce stream combination 2 
 English, Accountancy, Business Studies, Economics and Informatics.

Facilities
The school has a 15 -acre campus accommodating almost a hundred thousand sq ft of constructed area which includes 60 class rooms, indoor stadium, A.V rooms, labs in different disciplines, a library block, administrative block etc. and swimming pool . The school has sports track, soccer field, basketball and good facilities for sports and games.

  Library
The school has a library and reading room. It has a large collection of books ranging from periodicals to encyclopedias and educational books.
  Smartclass
To make learning a fun activity, the school is equipped with Educomp smart class program.
  Laboratories
The school has labs for Physics, Chemistry, Biology, Mathematics and Computer Education.
  Computer lab 
A course offers training in the use of computer and programming. A computer network has been installed in the school for the purpose. The school has an internet connection. Classes XI and XII have C++ and Informatics Practices as optional subjects. 
  Transportation
The school has seven school buses .

Faculty
The school has 80 members in the faculty with most of them post graduates in the disciplines concerned. They are supported by trained assistants in every department.

The school has a Parent Teacher Association which acts as an advisory body and ensures co–ordination between the parents, staff and management.

Notable alumni

Madonna Sebastian, Film actress, Malayalam

External links
 Official Website
 St Peter' Schools WikiMapia link

References

Primary schools in Kerala
High schools and secondary schools in Kerala
Schools in Ernakulam district
Educational institutions established in 1967